Tarek Morad (Arabic: طارق مراد; born August 21, 1992) is an American professional soccer player who currently plays for Oakland Roots in the USL Championship.

Early life

Personal
Tarek was born in Los Angeles, CA and raised in Chino Hills, CA to Egyptian parents and has two older brothers. He attended Chino Hills High School where he would twice win the Sierra League and be named the Sierra League MVP as a Junior.

College and Youth
Morad was to originally play college soccer at UC Riverside as a midfielder but his scholarship offer was rescinded. Instead he enrolled at Mt. San Antonio College in 2010.  While at Mt. San Antonio he led the Mounties to the South Coast Conference Title as well the California Junior College State Championship.  He was also named to the All-Conference team.

In 2011 Morad would transfer to UC Irvine where he would be converted to a defender.  He would play in 61 matches and score three goals during his time there.  During his Senior year UC Irvine would win the Big West Conference Title and would make it to the quarterfinals of the NCAA Tournament; a school record.

In 2013 Morad also play with the Chivas USA U23 team.  Chivas would finish the year unbeaten on their way to the Coast Soccer League Championship where Morad would score the final goal of Championship match.

Club career

OKC Energy FC

2014 season
Morad would go undrafted in the 2014 MLS SuperDraft and after a trial with Seattle Sounders FC would sign with United Soccer League expansion side OKC Energy FC on February 27.  He would appear in 13 of Oklahoma's 28 regular season matches without scoring a goal.

Louisville City FC

2015 season
On February 19 Morad would sign with another USL expansion team; Louisville City FC.  He would make his debut on March 28 against Saint Louis and appear in 26 of Louisville's 28 regular season matches; scoring 2 goals.  He'd also play in two of Louisville's three US Open Cup matches and both of their USL Cup matches.

2016 season
Morad would play in 20 of Louisville's 30 regular season matches and make his season debut on April 2 against Orlando City B.  He scored his lone goal on June 21 against Toronto and would also contribute 2 assists.  He played in one of Louisville's US Open Cup matches as well as all three of Louisville's USL Cup matches.

2017 season
Morad would play in 26 of Louisville's 32 regular season matches and make his season debut on March 25 against Saint Louis.  He also played in both of Louisville's US Open Cup matches as well as all four of Louisville's USL Cup matches.  He scored his lone goal of the regular season in the final match against Richmond off the rebounded his own missed penalty kick.  This goal made him the 17th and final outfield player to score for Louisville during the season; the entire outfield roster.  He would also score a brace in the first half of Louisville's opening USL Cup match against Bethlehem. Morad and Louisville would go on to win the USL Cup Final against Swope Park.

Morad would not be resigned by Louisville after the season.  He left Louisville as their all-time leader in both league and overall appearances with 75 and 88 appearances respectively.

Tampa Bay Rowdies

2018 season
On August 8 Morad signed with the Tampa Bay Rowdies of the USL and made his Tampa debut on the day, helping the Rowdies earn a clean sheet against Charleston.

2019 season
The 2019 season saw Morad become a crucial player for the Tampa Bay Rowdies, making 34 appearances as his team finished 5th in the Eastern Conference, before losing the Conference Quarter Final 2–1 to his old team Louisville City on October 27, 2019. On November 19, 2019, Morad announced on his Twitter account that he was leaving the Tampa Bay Rowdies.

San Diego Loyal SC

2020 season
On September 1, 2020, Morad joined USL Championship side San Diego Loyal for the remainder of the season.

Oakland Roots

2021 season
On December 21, 2020, it was announced that Morad would join USL Championship side Oakland Roots ahead of their inaugural season in the league.

Career statistics
Professional appearances – correct as of November 25, 2020.

Honors
Louisville City FC
 USL Cup: 2017

References

External links
 
 
 
 

1992 births
Living people
American people of Egyptian descent
American soccer players
Association football defenders
Chino Hills High School alumni
Louisville City FC players
Oakland Roots SC players
OC Pateadores Blues players
OKC Energy FC players
People from Chino Hills, California
San Diego Loyal SC players
Soccer players from Los Angeles
Sportspeople from San Bernardino County, California
Tampa Bay Rowdies players
UC Irvine Anteaters men's soccer players
USL Championship players
USL League Two players